A muddler is a bartender's tool, used like a pestle to mash—or muddle—fruits, herbs and spices in the bottom of a glass to release their flavor.

Description 
The tool is shaped like a small baseball bat and must be long enough to touch the bottom of the glass being used. The bottom of a muddler may be textured, toothed, or smooth. Muddlers can be made from plastic, stainless steel, or wood.

Use 
Ingredients are muddled in the bottom of a class before any liquids are added.

Cocktails that require the use of a muddler include:
 Mojito, made with light rum
 Caipirinha, made with cachaça
 Caipiroska, made with vodka
 Mint julep, made with Bourbon whiskey
 Old fashioned, made with whiskey or brandy

See also
 Mortar and pestle

References 

Bartending equipment